Mézières-en-Brenne is a commune in the Indre department in central France.

Natural park
It is located is at the heart of the Brenne regional natural park. The Brenne is one of France's most important wetlands. A large diversity of natural habitats is responsible for an abundance of wildlife of which the best known are the birds: purple heron, black-necked grebe, bittern, marsh harrier, whiskered tern, short-toed eagle. The Brenne is also Europe's most important site for the European pond tortoise.

Population

See also
Communes of the Indre department

References

External links

 Brenne Regional Natural Park website

Communes of Indre
Touraine